Ernst Wolfgang Kirchbach (18 September 1857, in London, England – 8 September 1906, in Bad Nauheim) was a German critic and writer.

Biography
He was the son of German artist Ernst Kirchbach and his wife Emma née Schmitthenner-Stockhausen. He studied philosophy and history in Dresden and Leipzig. Settling in Dresden in 1888, he was editor of the Magazin für Litteratur des In- und Auslandes (Magazine for domestic and foreign literature). Beginning 1896, he lived in Berlin. and became a leading member of the "Giordano Bruno Bund" of freethinking intellectuals.

Works

 Märchen (Tales, 1879)
 Salvator Rosa, a romance (1880)
 Gedichte (Poems, 1883)
 Das Leben auf der Walze (Life on rollers, 1892)
 Die letzten Menschen, a drama (The last people, 1892)
 Miniaturen (Stuttgart 1892)
 Des Sonnenreichs Untergang (Twilight of the sun's realm, Dresden, 1895)
 Gordon Pascha (Dresden, 1895)
 Eginhardt und Emma (ib. 1896)
 Der Lieder vom Zweirad (Song of the bicycle, 1900)

References

References
 

1857 births
1906 deaths
German poets
Writers from Berlin
German male poets
19th-century poets
19th-century German writers
19th-century German male writers